Richard T. Lee may refer to:

 Richard Lee (Canadian politician) (born 1954), member of the British Columbia Legislative Assembly
 Richard T. Lee (golfer) (born 1990), Canadian golfer